Gavin Hoare (4 July 1934 – 22 December 1992) was  a former Australian rules footballer who played with Richmond in the Victorian Football League (VFL).

Notes

External links 
		

1934 births
1992 deaths
Australian rules footballers from Victoria (Australia)
Richmond Football Club players